Sinking Creek is a stream in Lincoln County, Washington, in the United States.

Sinking Creek was named for the fact it is a losing stream on its downstream portion.

See also
List of rivers of Washington

References

Rivers of Lincoln County, Washington
Rivers of Washington (state)